Grandhomme or de Grandhomme may refer to:

Grandhomme
Friedrich Wilhelm Grandhomme (1834–1907), German artist (:de:Friedrich_Wilhelm_Grandhomme) 
Paul Grandhomme (1851–1944), French medalist, engraver and enameller

de Grandhomme
Colin de Grandhomme (born 1986), Zimbabwean-born-New Zealand cricketer
Laurence de Grandhomme (1956–2017), Zimbabwean cricketer